William Colin Winfrey (May 9, 1916 – April 14, 1994) was an American Hall of Fame Thoroughbred racehorse trainer.

Bill Winfrey was born Colin Dickard. His father died when he was three, and two years later his mother married Hall-of-Fame trainer G. Carey Winfrey. He was officially adopted and took Winfrey's last name. At age 15, he became a jockey, but weight gain forced him to turn to training. In 1932, he became the youngest licensed trainer in the United States. His career was interrupted by service with the United States Marine Corps during World War II. He retired after the 1969 season, but returned to training for two more years in 1977 and 1978. During his career, Bill Winfrey trained 38 stakes winners, including seven champions, of which three were inducted in the U. S. Racing Hall of Fame. The most noted of them was two-time American Horse of the Year, Native Dancer. Winfrey was inducted into the United States' National Museum of Racing and Hall of Fame in 1971.

A resident of San Clemente, California, he died in Lake Forest, California, at age 77 of complications from Alzheimer's disease. His son, Carey Winfrey, was a journalist and editor who served as the editor-in-chief of the Smithsonian magazine from 2001 to 2011 as well as the editor-in-chief of Cuisine and American Health magazines.

References

1916 births
1994 deaths
Deaths from Alzheimer's disease
Deaths from dementia in California
United States Marine Corps personnel of World War II
United States Marines
American racehorse trainers
United States Thoroughbred Racing Hall of Fame inductees
Sportspeople from Detroit
People from San Clemente, California
American jockeys